Matt Cranitch (born 1948) is an Irish fiddle player. Cranitch is a founding member of Na Fili. He is a graduate in electrical engineering and music from University College Cork, lectures at the Cork Institute of Technology on subjects of electronic engineering and music technology. He has a particular involvement in the music of Sliabh Luachra, on the Cork/Kerry border, and is engaged in on-going research on the fiddling style of this region at the Irish World Music Centre, University of Limerick. He has written extensively on Irish traditional music. He has also been a member of the band Sliabh Notes.

He currently lives in Cork.

See also Na Fili Discography.

References

Irish fiddlers
Living people
Place of birth missing (living people)
1948 births
Musicians from County Cork
21st-century violinists